Lymington River Reedbeds is a  biological Site of Special Scientific Interest in Lymington in Hampshire. It is a nature reserve  managed by the Hampshire and Isle of Wight Wildlife Trust. It is part of Solent and Southampton Water Ramsar site and  Special Protection Area.

This site in the Lymington River estuary was formerly tidal, but salt water has been excluded since the nineteenth century by a one way tide flap. It has reedbeds and unimproved grassland which provide an important habitat for breeding and migrating birds. The reedbeds have large populations of aphids, which provide food for the birds.

References

 

Hampshire and Isle of Wight Wildlife Trust
Sites of Special Scientific Interest in Hampshire